Slevin's elf skink (Nannoscincus slevini), also known commonly as Slevin's dwarf skink, is an endangered species of lizard in the family Scincidae. The species is endemic to New Caledonia.

Etymology
The specific name, slevini, is in honor of American herpetologist Joseph Richard Slevin.

Habitat

Description
It has only four toes on each front foot.

References

Further reading
Greer AE (1974). "The genetic relationships of the Scincid lizard genus Leiolopisma and its relatives". Australian Journal of Herpetology Supplemental Series 22 (31): 1–67. (Anotis slevini, new combination).
Loveridge A (1941). "An Undescribed Skink (Lygosoma) from New Caledonia". Proceedings of the Biological Society of Washington 54 193–194. (Lygosoma slevini, new species).

Nannoscincus
Reptiles described in 1941
Skinks of New Caledonia
Endemic fauna of New Caledonia
Taxa named by Arthur Loveridge